Yosua Pahabol is an Indonesian footballer who plays for Persiraja as a forward from 2017 to the current (2023/24) season.

International goals
Yosua Pahabol: International under-21 goals

Career
He played for Semen Padang from 2010 to 2013, then Barito Putera in 2014.  
He has played for Persiraja from 2017 till the current (2023/24) season.

Honours

Club honours
Semen Padang
Indonesia Premier League (1): 2011-12
Indonesian Community Shield (1): 2013

References

http://www.liga-indonesia.co.id/bli/index.php?go=news.profiledetail&type=detail&klub=138&id=2754

External links
Profile at footballdatabase.eu

Indonesian footballers
Living people
1993 births
People from Yahukimo Regency
Liga 1 (Indonesia) players
Semen Padang F.C. players
PS Barito Putera players
Indonesia youth international footballers
Association football wingers
Association football forwards
Sportspeople from Papua